René Massuet (13 August 1666 – 11 January 1716) was a French Benedictine patrologist, of the Congregation of St. Maur.

He was born at St. Ouen de Mancelles in the diocese of Évreux, and made his solemn profession in religion in 1682 at Notre Dame de Lire, and studied at Bonnenouvelle in Orléans, where he showed more than ordinary ability. After teaching philosophy in the Abbey of Bec, and theology at St. Stephen's, in Caen, he attended the lectures of the university and obtained the degrees of bachelor and licentiate in law.

After this he taught a year at Jumièges and three years at Fécamp. He spent the year 1702 in Rome in the study of Greek. The following year he was called to St. Germain des Prés in Paris and taught theology there to the end of his life.

His principal work, which he undertook rather reluctantly, is the edition of the writings of St. Irenaeus, Paris, 1710. An elegant edition of these writings had appeared at Oxford, 1702, but the editor John Ernest Grabe was less intent on an accurate rendering of the text than on making Irenaeus favour Anglican views. Massuet enriched his edition with valuable dissertations on the heresies impugned by St. Irenaeus and on the life, writings, and teaching of the saint.

He also edited the fifth volume of the Annales Ordinis S. Benediciti, of Jean Mabillon, with some additions and a preface inclusive of the biographies of Mabillon and Thierry Ruinart. We owe him, moreover, a letter to John B. Langlois, S.J., in defence of the Benedictine edition of St. Augustine, and five letters addressed to Bernard Pez found in J. G. Schelhorn's Amoenitates Literariae. He left in manuscript a work entitled Augustinus Graecus, in which he quotes all the passages of St. John Chrysostom on grace.

References

1666 births
1716 deaths
17th-century French people
18th-century French people
French Benedictines
People from Eure
University of Caen Normandy alumni